Eopauropus balticus is a prehistoric pauropod known from mid-Eocene Baltic amber. It is the only known pauropod in the fossil record. As pauropods are normally soil-dwelling, their presence in amber (fossilized tree sap) is unusual, and they are the rarest known animals in Baltic amber.

References

Prehistoric myriapods
Baltic amber
Fossil taxa described in 2001